Robert Mathews (26 August 1912 – 14 April 1989) was an Australian rules footballer who played with North Melbourne and Essendon in the Victorian Football League (VFL).

Mathews was a back pocket defender, but started as a forward and topped North Melbourne's goal-kicking in the 1930 VFL season, with 29 goals. He switched clubs in 1935, joining Essendon, but would only make two appearances for the club. After leaving Essendon he played for La Mascotte.

Mathews later served in the Royal Australian Air Force during the later part of World War II.

References

1912 births
Australian rules footballers from Victoria (Australia)
North Melbourne Football Club players
Essendon Football Club players
1989 deaths